Mandy Morgan (born 4 July 1953) is an Australian former professional tennis player.

A native of Adelaide, Morgan competed on the professional tour in the early 1970s.

Morgan twice won through to the singles second round of the Australian Open and was a doubles quarter-finalist in the 1973 tournament (with Pam Whytcross). She appeared in the mixed doubles third round at Wimbledon in 1974.

References

External links
 
 

1953 births
Living people
Australian female tennis players
Tennis players from Adelaide